Abigail is a 2019 American short drama film directed and produced by Max Hechtman and Christonikos Tsalikis. The film served as Hechtman's senior thesis. It is influenced by a one-scene screenplay of the same name by writer Jason K. Allen and is inspired by a true story dealing with the subject matter of end-of-life decisions.

It was first screened as part of the Fashion Institute of Technology Film and Media Program's senior show on May 17, 2019 and was a year later named a quarterfinalist in Stage 32's 5th Annual Short Film Contest. Its first public screening took place virtually on October 6, 2020 at the 2020 Long Island International Film Expo, where it won the Audience Award, and was nominated for Best Short Film, Best Long Island Short Film and Best Director. This was followed by a screening at the Point Lookout Film Festival on March 31, 2021.

Premise
A lonely and elderly widower struggles to come to terms with the loss of his wife and the circumstances surrounding her death. When he visits her grave, he encounters a little girl who shows him the path to healing and fills him with hope.

Cast
 Richie Allan as Elmer
 Elvira Tortora as Abigail
 Lauren Hart as Woman at Cemetery
 Leilani Marie Vasquez as The Girl

Production

Development
Jason K. Allen's original script for the film was of just the cemetery scene. When Max Hechtman optioned the script, documentary filmmaker Josh Koury, his professor at the time, encouraged Hechtman to expand upon it in order to fit the requirements of the senior thesis assignment. Hechtman worked closely with his mother, Meryl Hechtman, co-director Christonikos Tsalikis and script editor Miscelleana Tsalikis to make the story fit the required 15-20 minute length limit of the assignment.

It is Hechtman's first narrative short to feature professional actors in the roles, with Elvira Tortora and child actress Leilani Marie Vasquez making their screen debuts as Abigail and The Girl respectively.

Filming
Filming took place in Merrick, NY and at All Faiths Cemetery in Middle Village, NY from November 21, 2018 to April 25, 2019.

Post-production
Post-production on the film was completed in August 2019.

Reception
Jenna Reilly of Take 2 Indie Review gave the film 4 stars and wrote that it "not only explores the emotional toll of grieving a loved one – it also gives the viewer a powerful message of hope. If we are open to receiving the signs that surround us – we realize that our loved ones are always with us and that love – never dies."

Accolades

References

External links
 Official Site
 
Abigail at Max Hechtman's website

2019 films
2019 short films
2019 drama films
American drama short films
Films about depression
Films about death
Films about suicide
American nonlinear narrative films
Films directed by Max Hechtman
2010s English-language films
2010s American films